The American School of The Hague is an international school located in Wassenaar, Netherlands. Student enrollment ages are between 3 to 18 years old. They represent up to 80 nationalities, with 28% American and 15% Dutch nationals.

Overview
ASH was founded in 1953. Its purpose was to provide an American style education to children of international cooperation and government employees. The board of trustees are elected by the parents and are responsible for the governance of ASH. The school is accredited by NEASC - New England Association of Schools and Colleges. The school has three divisions: an elementary school, middle school and high school. In 1989, a new campus was built, next to the Rijksstraatweg in Wassenaar which was opened by then-Queen Beatrix of the Netherlands and First Lady Barbara Bush.

References

External links
 Official website

Schools in South Holland
American international schools in the Netherlands
International Baccalaureate schools in the Netherlands
Educational institutions established in 1953
1953 establishments in the Netherlands
Wassenaar